Paikmal  is a town  in Bargarh district in the Indian state of Odisha.

Geography
It is almost  from its district headquarters, Bargarh.
Paikmal is a block of Padampur subdivision, distance from Paikmal to Padampur is about .One can reach Pailmal from padampur bargarh district

Demographics
 India census, Paikmal had a population of 3916. Male population was 2027 and female population was 1889, this is little low to compare with males population. Paikmal has an literacy rate about nearly 61%.

Politics 
Current MLA from Padmapur Assembly Constituency is Barsha Singh Bariha of BJD. The former MLA  from Padampur Assembly Constituency was Pradeep Purohit of BJP from 2014 till 2018.

School & College 

 Jawahar navodaya vidyalaya Paikmal
 Paikmal highschool Paikmal
 Yomunakandhuni  Girls highschool Paikmal
 Adarsha vidyalaya Paikmal
 3 num. Of Govt Primary school in Paikmal town
 Govt ME School Paikmal
 Mahamaya public school Paikmal 
 sri aurobindo school Paikmal
 Saraswati sishuvidya mandir Paikmal
 Vindiya Vasini Digree college Paikmal
 SSN Ayurved College and Research Institute Paikmal

Cities and towns in Bargarh district